Junior Farzan Ali (commonly known as The Razor Farzan) is a Fijian professional boxer. He is the current WBF Asia Pacific lightweight champion. With 25 wins for 32 fights, Farzan is regarded as Fiji's best pound for pound boxer. He has a brother, Joy Ali who is also ranked internationally. Farzan is scheduled to fight Ryan Langham for the World Boxing Foundation Welterweight title in August. Farzan is Fiji's local champion in seven divisions ranging from bantamweight to welterweight.

Early life 
Farzan Ali was born on 27 April 1980 in Nadi, Fiji. He has had a brother Joy Ali. He used to sell razor blades and then he left selling razor blades and trained to become a boxer. Farzan is a Muslim. Farzan has a son named Ali.

Boxing career 
Farzan has won 25 wins for 32 fights. He is the current WBF Asia Pacific lightweight champion.

External links
 Box Rec profile

References

1980 births
Living people
Welterweight boxers
Fijian Muslims
Fijian male boxers
Sportspeople from Nadi